The 2008 Victoria Cup was the first edition of the Victoria Cup challenge, played on October 1, 2008, between the 2008 European Champions Cup winners, Metallurg Magnitogorsk, and the New York Rangers of the National Hockey League (NHL), at the PostFinance Arena in Bern, Switzerland. The game was played under IIHF rules. The Rangers won the challenge as they battled from a 3–0 deficit to win the game 4–3.

The match was preceded on September 30, 2008, by an exhibition between host SC Bern and the New York Rangers, meant to commemorate the centennial of the Swiss Ice Hockey Association. However the additional game, the first ever between a Swiss team and an NHL team, ended up competing with the main event at the box office. With tickets steeply priced, neither game sold out and a number of Swiss fans favored the SC Bern game, which drew a significantly larger audience (16,022) than the actual Victoria Cup game.

The New York Rangers defeated SC Bern in this game 8–1. The Rangers followed the Victoria Cup game with two NHL regular season games against the Tampa Bay Lightning in Prague, Czech Republic, on October 4 and 5 at the O2 Arena. Both games were won 2–1 by the Rangers.

Game description
The goalies in the game were Henrik Lundqvist for the New York Rangers and Andrei Mezin for Metallurg Magnitogorsk.

At 1:28 of the first period, Metallurg's Denis Platonov scored a goal past Lundqvist to give them the lead.  With 18:07 gone in the first, with the Rangers' Paul Mara in the box for holding, Vladimir Malenkikh made it 2–0 for Magnitogorsk on the power-play.

In the second period, Nikolai Zavarukhin scored another power-play goal at 30:20 to give Magnitogorsk a 3–0 lead over New York, this time with Petr Prucha in the box for holding.  Late in the second, Metallurg ran into penalty trouble as Alexei Kaigorodov and Zavarukhin found their way to the box for holding.  The two-man power-play led to a goal at 39:37 for Chris Drury.  

In the third, penalty troubles continued to plague Magnitogorsk. At 45:45 Dan Fritsche scored for the Rangers to make the score 3–2.  Then, with Metallurg's Stanislav Chistov in the penalty box for hooking, Drury scored his second power play goal of the game at 50:13 .  With the score tied 3–3, the Rangers were badly outshooting Metallurg. In the last minute, Ryan Callahan picked off a sloppy pass by defenseman Vladimir Malenkikh at Metallurg's blue line and came in alone on goalie Mezin. In a "shoot-out move", he faked a backhand shot, switched to his forehand and managed to wrap the puck around Mezin's outstretched right leg for the game-winning goal at 59:40.

Lundqvist stopped 22 of 25 shots for the win, while Mezin stopped 40 of 44 shots for Magnitogorsk. According to Lundqvist, "I think we should have won the game, and we did. I think we were the better team. They got some easy goals the first period and made it tough on us. That's on me, but the way we came back in this game was great to see. I think we learned a lot. It gave us confidence moving forward, and now we don't have to hear about it."

The Victoria Cup Trophy was accepted on behalf of the team by Nikolai Zherdev and Dmitri Kalinin, the two Russian players on the Rangers. The Rangers received $1,000,000 for their victory.

SC Bern vs New York Rangers

Game summary

Scoring summary

Penalty summary

Team rosters

  Ilya Proskuryakov dressed for the Metallurg Magnitogorsk as the back-up goalie and did not enter the game.
  Stephen Valiquette dressed for the New York Rangers as the back-up goalie and did not enter the game.

Source Magnitogorsk,  New York

Officials 
 Referees –  Dan Ohalloran,  Jyri Rönn
 Linesmen –  Lonnie Cameron, Stefan Fonselius

René Fasel of IIHF

Notes

External links
 Victoria Cup website

Victoria Cup (ice hockey)
2008–09 in European ice hockey
2008
2008–09 NHL season
2008–09 in Russian ice hockey
2008 in Swiss sport